Ben Dent is a German rugby league footballer who plays for the Heworth ARLFC in the National Conference League competition. He primarily plays as a er and has previously played for the York City Knights. He plays for Germany internationally. On 4 May 2019 he married childhood sweetheart Harriet Dyson-Dent of Wood Lea.

In January 2018 Ben was diagnosed with type 1 diabetes.

Career

York City Knights
Dent made his début season for the York City Knights in 2012, playing 5 games. In his 79 appearances for the Knights, he scored 37 tries.

Newcastle Thunder
At the end of the 2017 season, it was announced that Dent had signed with the Newcastle Thunder.

York RUFC
Dent made a temporary switch to rugby union in 2018 to play for York RUFC

International
Dent made his international debut for Germany in 2016 against the Wales Dragonhearts, scoring a try. He was selected to play for Germany in the 2021 World Cup qualifiers.

References

1991 births
Living people
Germany national rugby league team players
Newcastle Thunder players
Rugby league fullbacks
Rugby league wingers
York City Knights players